, provisional designation  is a trans-Neptunian object in the scattered disc, located in the outermost regions of the Solar System. It was discovered on 14 September 2010, by Pan-STARRS at Haleakala Observatory on the island of Maui, Hawaii, in the United States. The object's diameter has been estimated to measure approximately 600 kilometers.

Orbit and classification 

 belongs to the scattered disc population. It orbits the Sun at a distance of 40.1–61.6 AU once every 362 years and 6 months (132,399 days; semi-major axis of 50.8 AU). Its orbit has an eccentricity of 0.21 and an inclination of 15° with respect to the ecliptic. The body's observation arc begins on 14 September 2011 at Haleakala, more than 3 years prior to its official first observation. Its orbit still has a high uncertainty.

Numbering and naming 

This minor planet was numbered by the Minor Planet Center on 25 September 2018. As of 2018, it has not been named.

Physical characteristics 

As of 2018, no rotational lightcurve of this object has been obtained from photometric observations. The object's rotation period, pole and shape remain unknown.

References

External links 
 List Of Centaurs and Scattered-Disk Objects, Minor Planet Center
 
 

523759
523759
523759
20100914